Gylling is a village in Jutland, Denmark. It is located in Odder Municipality.

History
Gylling Church was built in the later half of the 1100s. 

Gylling in 1688 consisted of 22 farms and 33 half-farms, with 6 houses with land and 2 houses without land. The total cultivated area was 854.2 barrels of land owed to 154.37 barrels of grains.

Notable residents
Karen Jeppe (1876 — 1935), social worker known for her work with Ottoman Armenian refugees and survivors of the Armenian Genocide, mainly widows and orphans, from 1903 until her death in Syria in 1935. 
Mogens Jeppesen (born 1953), handball player

References

Odder Municipality
Cities and towns in the Central Denmark Region
Villages in Denmark